The  were a class of kaibōkan (equivalent to US destroyer escorts or British frigates) built for the Imperial Japanese Navy just prior to World War II. Four ships out of an initially planned 16 vessels were completed.

Background
The Shimushu-class kaibōkan, as with the  torpedo boat, was a consequence of the 1930 London Naval Treaty, which placed limitations on the total destroyer tonnage the Imperial Japanese Navy was permitted. One way in which the treaty could be circumvented was to use a loophole in the treaty which permitted ships of between 600 and 2,000 tons, with no more than four guns over 76mm, no torpedoes, and with a maximum speed of no more than 20 knots. A new class of vessel was designed to use this loophole, and was given the obsolete designation of kaibōkan (Kai = sea, ocean, Bo = defence, Kan = ship), which had previously been used to designate obsolete warships which had been reassigned to coastal defense duties. However, due to many other priorities, the budget for this new class was not secured until the 1937 3rd Naval Armaments Supplement Programme.

Design
Due to the low priority of the project, the design of the Shimushu-class was subcontracted out to a private firm, Mitsubishi Heavy Industries. The Imperial Japanese Navy had intended for a simple design whose primary role was patrol and fisheries protection of the remote and sub-Arctic Kurile Islands, which would free destroyers currently used for this role for higher priority missions. The secondary role of the new class was to be minesweeping, and convoy escort was considered a minor third priority.

However, the design developed by Mitsubishi was more complex than the Imperial Japanese Navy had anticipated, with a double-curved bow and a forecastle deck which improved seaworthiness in the rough northern seas. The hull was also reinforced and insulated against the cold weather. The consequence was that the design was not suited to prefabrication or mass production, and construction times which created problems when more vessels were needed in a short time after the start of the Pacific War.

The Shimushu-class was well armed for its size. The main armament of the Shimushu class consisted of three Type 3  guns in single mounts, one superfiring pair aft and one mount forward of the superstructure, which had been taken from old destroyers. The minesweeping role was accomplished by two paravanes on each beam. The ASW role was accomplished with 18 Type 95 depth charges, but this was doubled in May 1942 when the minesweeping gear was removed and a Type 93 sonar was installed. The anti-submarine weaponry later rose to 60 depth charges with a Type 97  trench mortar and six depth charge throwers. 

Anti-aircraft protection was by four Type 96  anti-aircraft guns in two twin-gun mounts abreast the bridge. This was later increased by August 1943 when the twin-mounts were replaced by triple-mounts, and an additional three triple-mounts,  one in front of the bridge and two behind the smokestack were added. A Type 22 radar was also installed in 1943 and a Type 13 in 1944.

Operational service
Despite being designed for operations in northern waters, the lead vessel of the class,  was used primarily in southern waters for convoy escort. She survived the war and was given as a prize of war to the Soviet Navy, which continued to use her until 1959.  was sunk by a submarine in 1944.   and  served in the northern Pacific, and both were scrapped after the end of the war.

Ships in class
The four ships were ordered as ships #9 to #12 under the 3rd Naval Armaments Supplement Programme in 1937.

Notes

References

External links 

 Shimushu class at Imperial Japanese Navy.com

Shimushu